Mágico (Portuguese for either the adjective "magic" or the noun "magician") is an album by bassist Charlie Haden, saxophonist Jan Garbarek and guitarist Egberto Gismonti recorded in 1979 and released on the ECM label.

Reception 
The AllMusic review by Scott Yanow awarded the album four stars, stating, "The trio performs group originals and an obscurity during the picturesque and continually interesting release; this combination works well".

Track listing
All compositions by Egberto Gismonti except as indicated:

 "Bailarina" (Geraldo Carneiro, Piry Reis) – 14:30 
 "Mágico" – 7:47 
 "Silence" (Charlie Haden) – 10:17 
 "Spor" (Jan Garbarek) – 6:11 
 "Palhaço" – 5:00

Recorded at Talent Studio in Oslo, Norway in June 1979

Personnel
 Charlie Haden – bass
 Jan Garbarek – saxophone
 Egberto Gismonti – guitar, piano

References

External links 
 Charlie Haden / Jan Garbarek / Egberto Gismonti - Mágico (1980) album review by Scott Yanow, credits & releases at AllMusic
 Charlie Haden / Jan Garbarek / Egberto Gismonti - Mágico (1980) album releases & credits at Discogs
 Charlie Haden / Jan Garbarek / Egberto Gismonti - Mágico (1980) album to be listened as stream on Spotify

ECM Records albums
Charlie Haden albums
Jan Garbarek albums
Egberto Gismonti albums
1979 albums
Albums produced by Manfred Eicher